Fremont Unified School District (FUSD) is a primary and secondary education school district located in Fremont, California, United States.

It serves the entire city limits of Fremont.

The district has 28 elementary school campuses, five junior high campuses, five high school campuses, and one alternative school campus.

School campuses and attendance areas
The district determines attendance at schools based on where an individual lives as its first priority. There are five main attendance areas: American Attendance Area, Irvington Attendance Area, Kennedy Attendance Area, Mission Attendance Area and Washington Attendance Area. All include one high school and one junior high school, in addition to either four or six elementary schools. The attendance areas are further split up into smaller areas for the elementary schools. Often, overcrowding in elementary schools is addressed by moving students to another elementary school in the same attendance area.

High schools
The district has five comprehensive high schools for 9th through 12th grade students. The attendance areas take their names from the five high schools. American High School serves the northern part of Fremont. Irvington High School serves the southern portion of Fremont, away from the Mission San Jose. John F. Kennedy High School serves the area between Irvington and Washington. Mission San Jose High School serves the Mission San Jose neighborhood. Washington High School serves the central area of Fremont, just below American's attendance area, and extends to the Niles area, just north of Mission San Jose.

Junior High schools
There are five junior high schools for 6th, 7th and 8th grade students, one for every attendance area. (Added 6th Grade in 2020)

 Thornton Junior High School is part of the American Attendance Area. 
 Horner Middle School is part of the Irvington Attendance Area. 
 Walters Middle School is part of the Kennedy Attendance Area. 
 Hopkins Junior High School is part of the Mission Attendance Area. 
 Centerville Junior High School is part of the Washington Attendance Area.

All of the junior high schools accept graduates of the elementary schools of their attendance area.

Elementary schools

The 28 kindergarten through grade 6 elementary schools are split among five different attendance areas based on a local high school and junior high school. Although these are generally localized attendance areas, the high school or junior high school that an elementary school funnels into may not necessarily be the school that is closest to the elementary school.

The elementary schools of the American Attendance Area are Ardenwood Elementary School, Brookvale Elementary School, Forest Park Elementary School, Oliveira Elementary School, Patterson Elementary School and Warwick Elementary School.

The elementary schools of the Irvington Attendance Area are Harvey Green Elementary School, Grimmer Elementary School, Hirsch Elementary School, Leitch Elementary School, Warm Springs Elementary School and Weibel Elementary School.

The elementary schools of the Kennedy Attendance Area are Azevada Elementary School, Blacow Elementary School, Brier Elementary School, Durham Elementary School, Mattos Elementary School and Millard Elementary School.

The elementary schools of the Mission Attendance Area are Chadbourne Elementary School, Gomes Elementary School, Mission San Jose Elementary School and Mission Valley Elementary School.

The elementary schools of the Washington Attendance Area are Cabrillo Elementary School, Glenmoor Elementary School, Maloney Elementary School, Niles Elementary School, Parkmont Elementary School and Vallejo Mill Elementary School.

Fremont Adult School, located on Calaveras Avenue, is a popular educational institution offering a variety of adult education programs including ESL, Adult Basic Education, Community Education, Distance Learning, and ELCivics.

Alternative schools
There are three alternative schools operated by the Fremont Unified School District. All are at the same location. The junior high school alternative is Opportunity Program. The alternative for high school is Robertson High School. A third alternative school is called Vista Alternative.

Board of education
The Board of Education consists of five individuals elected at large by the voters of the district. A board member's term is for four years and has no term limit. The positions of president, vice president, and clerk are rotated among the members. The board also includes one appointed student member, who is generally the Associated Student Body President of one of the five high schools.

In 2020-21 school year, FUSD decided to offer distance learning to keep in mind the situation of COVID19 however this policy can be changed depend upon COVID19.

Current board members
As of October 2021, the President of the Board of Education is Larry Sweeney. The Vice President is Dianne Jones. The Clerk is Vivek Prasad. Other members of the board are Yajing Zhang and Desrie Campbell.

The Student Board Member is Tushar Dalmia.

Board meetings
The board has public meetings every two weeks, in addition to other closed-door meetings. The board usually meets every other Wednesday at the Fremont Unified School District building at 4210 Technology Drive, in Fremont.

The office of the superintendent
The superintendent of the Fremont Unified School District is appointed by the Board of Education. The superintendent acts as the supervisor of all schools and makes many administrative decisions at schools.

Selection of the superintendent
The superintendent is selected by a vote of the Board of Education. Usually the public leaders around the attendance areas have a lot of input before a candidate is selected by the board. The candidate generally goes through an extensive interview process before being considered for the position.

As of October 2021, the Superintendent is CJ Cammack.

Inappropriate Relationships
In November 2016, officials began investigating a possible inappropriate relationship involving a teacher and a student.

References

External links

 Fremont Unified School District

 
Education in Fremont, California
School districts in Alameda County, California